Kwanchai Suklom (born 12 January 1995), is a Thai professional footballer who plays as a goalkeeper for Thai League 1 club PT Prachuap.

Honours

Club 
Buriram United
 Thai League 1 (1): 2017

PT Prachuap
 Thai League Cup (1): 2019

External links 
 

1995 births
Living people
Kwanchai Suklom
Kwanchai Suklom
Association football goalkeepers
Kwanchai Suklom
Kwanchai Suklom
Kwanchai Suklom
Kwanchai Suklom
Kwanchai Suklom
Kwanchai Suklom
Footballers at the 2018 Asian Games
Kwanchai Suklom